La Ronde et autres faits divers (1982) is the title of a set of short stories written in French by French Nobel laureate J. M. G. Le Clézio and translated into English as The Round & Other Cold Hard Facts.

Geographical Background

The reviewer of this book from the New York Times finds the protagonists of the 11 stories in The Round & Other Cold Hard Facts to be  underprivileged although they are residents of a very privileged area: the French Riviera.

Critique

Uneven

The reviewer of this book from Barnes & Noble wrote that even though none of the eleven short-stories are out of the ordinary, the author does however find strange goings on. This reviewer surmises that this collection of stories is uneven and the style of writing can make for monotonous reading.

It is quite often painfully hard to read

According to John Pilling  there is  insistent use of the present tense used throughout the book that produced in the mind of this reviewer "a kind of literary indigestion". He went on to mention that a person could  "fear the snare of thinking that this sort of literary indigestion is therefore good for the person reading!"

There is suffering in every story
 sometimes just because the protagonist is lonely
 maybe has been robbed (injured or raped)
 some vagabonds try to smuggle across the Italian border
 two girls run away from home
 how a child becomes a thief
 a woman gives birth alone on the carpet of her mobile home
 a girl is crushed to death by a truck
 another girl is raped in a communal basement

Table of contents

Original title in French
 La ronde
 Moloch
 L'échappé
 Ariane
 Villa Aurore
 Le jeu d'Anne
 La grande vie
 Le passeur
 O voleur, voleur, quelle vie est la tienne?
 Orlamonde
 David

Translated into English
 The Round
 Moloch
 The Escapee
 Ariadne
 Villa Aurora
 Anne's Game
 The Great Life
 The Runner
 O Thief What Is the Life You Lead?
 Yondaland
 David

Publication history

First French Edition

Also published as La Ronde Et Autres Faits Divers: [Nouvelles] (Le Chemin)

Second French Edition

Also published by Gallimard Education as Ronde Et Autres Faits Divers (La) (Collectin Folio) in a  Mass Market Paperback format

Third French Edition

Also published as Ronde Et Autres Faits Divers (La) (Collectin Folio) by Gallimard Education

Fourth French Edition

First English translation

Audio Edition in French
There is a spoken version of "La ronde et autres faits divers"CD & MP3 as read in French by Bernard Giraudeau.

Second English Edition

References

1982 short story collections
Short story collections by J. M. G. Le Clézio
Works by J. M. G. Le Clézio